The Nigel Mansell Sunseeker International Classic was a men's professional golf tournament on the European Seniors Tour from 2003 to 2005. It was staged at Woodbury Park Golf Club, Woodbury, Devon, England. Total prize money was £150,000 with the winner receiving £22,500.

The event was hosted by the former motor-racing driver Nigel Mansell, who had had his 50th birthday just before the inaugural event and played as an amateur. In 2003 he finished 60th on 7 over par, in 2004 he finished tied for 62nd place at 10 over par while in 2005 he finished in 52nd place, again on 10 over par.

Winners

External links
Coverage on the European Seniors Tour's official site (2005)
Coverage on the European Seniors Tour's official site (2004)
Coverage on the European Seniors Tour's official site (2003)

Former European Senior Tour events
Golf tournaments in England
Sport in Devon
Recurring sporting events established in 2003
Recurring sporting events disestablished in 2005